Mathew Dumba (born July 25, 1994) is a Canadian professional ice hockey defenceman and alternate captain for the Minnesota Wild of the National Hockey League (NHL). Dumba was selected with the seventh overall pick by the Wild in the first round of the 2012 NHL Entry Draft. Dumba previously played junior with the Red Deer Rebels and briefly for the Portland Winterhawks of the Western Hockey League (WHL).

Early life
Dumba is of Filipino (maternal) and Romanian and German (paternal) descent. He was born in Regina, Saskatchewan, and learned to skate at age three. His family later moved to Calgary, Alberta, where he played his minor hockey in Calgary with the Crowchild Minor Hockey Association. Dumba spent the 2009-10 season with the Edge School for Athletes in the Canadian Sport School Hockey League.

Playing career
The Red Deer Rebels of the Western Hockey League (WHL) selected Dumba with their first-round selection, fourth overall, in the 2009 WHL Bantam Draft. He made his WHL debut in 2009–10, his 15-year-old season, appearing in six regular season games and two playoff games for the Rebels. Joining the Rebels full-time in 2010–11, Dumba scored 15 goals and 26 points and was a player whom his coach said was noticeable every time he was on the ice. His performance during the season earned Dumba the Jim Piggott Memorial Trophy as the WHL's rookie-of-the-year.

Returning to the Rebels for the 2011–12 WHL season, Dumba scored 20 goals and 57 points in 69 games. He was the youngest player invited to the selection camp for the 2012 World Junior Hockey Championship, however he failed to make the team. However, he continued to impress scouts and observers with his play. Don Hay was one of several WHL coaches to praise Dumba for his enthusiasm on the ice and hard-checking style: "He's a guy who can do all aspects of the game ... he's a very dynamic player with or without the puck. Yes, he can lay out a good bodycheck, but he can also score the overtime winning goal."

Dumba's play in the WHL resulted in him being rated as one of the top prospects for the 2012 NHL Entry Draft. NHL Central Scouting ranked him as the 11th best prospect for the draft, while International Scouting Services ranked him 5th overall. The Minnesota Wild selected him in the first round, seventh overall, and quickly signed him to an NHL contract. Dumba was returned to the Rebels to begin the 2012–13 WHL season, in part due to a labour dispute between the NHL and its players. When the NHL's dispute was resolved, the Wild intended to give him a brief look at their training camp. Dumba impressed the team's coaching staff enough to earn a spot on the Wild's opening-night roster, however he was returned to Red Deer four games into the NHL season without having played with the Wild.

Dumba earned a spot in the Wild lineup to start the 2013–14 season and made his NHL debut on October 5, 2013, against the Anaheim Ducks, becoming the first player of Filipino descent to play in the NHL. He scored his first NHL goal on October 12 against Dan Ellis of the Dallas Stars. He recorded only two points in 13 games by December and the Wild loaned Dumba to the Canadian junior team for the 2014 World Junior Ice Hockey Championships. While Dumba was with the national team, the Rebels traded his WHL rights to the Portland Winterhawks and the Wild assigned him to Portland upon his return from the World Junior Championship.

In the 2015–16 season, Dumba had a breakout year, playing every game but one with the Minnesota Wild, seeing career highs in goals, assists, points, and penalty minutes with 10 goals, 16 assists, 26 points and 38 PIMS. The Wild also played an Outdoor game against the Chicago Blackhawks at TCF Bank Stadium as part of the NHL Stadium Series. Dumba got the scoring going early as he trailed the play after Ryan Carter had a breakaway, Carter had his shot saved and his rebound saved as well but Dumba poked in the third chance for his ninth goal of the season to give the Wild a 1–0 lead. He later picked up a roughing penalty when he destroyed Andrew Desjardins with a clean hit and Phillip Danault retaliated and tackled Dumba. The Wild went on to beat the Blackhawks 6–1. He played 81 out of the 82 games that season and the only game he missed was because his coach wanted to shake up the lineup for the struggling Wild, so he was named a healthy scratch in a 3–0 loss to the San Jose Sharks.

On July 28, 2016, he re-signed to a two-year, $5.1M bridge deal with the Wild. After not getting off to a good start for the Wild, new head coach Bruce Boudreau opted to scratch Dumba on October 20 against Toronto. The plan was foiled, however, when Marco Scandella became sick, forcing Dumba into the lineup. Since then, he has been playing alongside All-Star defenseman Ryan Suter on the first defensive pairing and has seen increased responsibilities and ice time. He has averaged 21:48 so far this season alongside Suter. That same season, Dumba established career-highs for goals with 11, assists with 23, and points with 34 on the year.

On July 21, 2018, Dumba signed a five-year, $30 million contract extension with the Wild, carrying an annual average of $6 million.

On June 8, 2020, Dumba became an inaugural executive board member of the Hockey Diversity Alliance, whose goal is to address intolerance and racism in hockey.

International play

Dumba made his debut with the national team program at the 2011 Ivan Hlinka Memorial Tournament. He was named captain of the under-18 national team and led Canada to a gold medal victory.

The 18-year-old Dumba participated in his second national junior team camp ahead of the 2013 World Junior Championship, but was among the final cuts and did not make the team.

Dumba was loaned from the Wild to the Canadian junior team for the 2014 World Junior Ice Hockey Championships. He narrowly avoided a suspension after being ejected from a pre-tournament game for kneeing a Swedish opponent, and recorded one assist in seven tournament games for the fourth-place Canadians.

Following the 2015–16 season, Dumba made his first appearance with Canada's national men's team, playing in all 10 games at the 2016 World Championships where Canada repeated as gold medallists.

Career statistics

Regular season and playoffs

International

Awards and honours

References
Career statistics:

External links

1994 births
Living people
Canadian ice hockey defencemen
Canadian sportspeople of Filipino descent
Canadian people of Romanian descent
Canadian people of German descent
Houston Aeros (1994–2013) players
King Clancy Memorial Trophy winners
Ice hockey people from Saskatchewan
Iowa Wild players
Minnesota Wild draft picks
Minnesota Wild players
National Hockey League first-round draft picks
Portland Winterhawks players
Red Deer Rebels players
Sportspeople from Regina, Saskatchewan